Pacitto is an Italian surname. Notable people with the surname include:

Brando Pacitto (born 1996), Italian actor
Marialia Pacitto (born 1989), Italian-American fashion designer

Italian-language surnames